Shaukeen is a 1982 Indian Hindi-language comedy film directed by Basu Chatterjee dealing with the psychological aspects of people reaching the dusk of their life. The movie stars Ashok Kumar, Utpal Dutt, A.K. Hangal, Rati Agnihotri and Mithun Chakraborty.

Basu Chaterjee loved the song Nitol Paye Rinik Jhinik sung and composed by S. D. Burman since childhood and requested S.D.'s son R. D. Burman to compose song Jab Bhi Koi using same tune in the film. The movie based on the story of Samaresh Basu and was loosely based on the 1962 American movie Boys' Night Out.

Plot
Shaukeen has 3 lecherous old men, played by Ashok Kumar, Utpal Dutt and A.K. Hangal. 
And all the three old men had one weakness i.e. Women. 
One day they meet up at Ashok kumar's place for drinks and decide to go away for a while on a vacation and enjoy the last years of their life before becoming completely senile.

They hire a driver Ravi (Mithun Chakraborty), a friend of the son of Choudhuri (Ashok Kumar), who takes the name Sakharam. He ends up convincing them to go to Goa where his lover, who works as a singer/dancer at a local club, resides. While in Goa, the three old men get into hilarious situations with Anita (Rati Agnihotri) as they try to impress her and try to get lucky with her, oblivious to the fact that she is their driver's love interest.

Cast
Ashok Kumar as Om Prakash Chaudhary
 Utpal Dutt as Jagdishbhai
A.K. Hangal as Indrasen (Anderson)
Mithun Chakraborty as Ravi Anand
Rati Agnihotri as Anita
 Gita Siddharth as Anuradha Devi
 Ashalata Wabgaonkar
 Jayshree T. Girl passing on the street

Songs
The music of the film was composed by R. D. Burman, while lyrics were penned by Yogesh.

01. "Ye Range Mehfil" - Asha Bhosle
 
02. "Aa Wahin Chal Mere Dil Khushi Jisne Di Hai"  - Suresh Wadkar

03. "Chalo Haseen Geet Ek Banaye"  - Ashok Kumar, Chirashree Bhattacharya

04. "Suhani Sham Aayi Hai"  - Asha Bhosle

05. "Jab Bhi Koi Kanganaa Bole Paayal Chhanak Jaaye"  - Kishore Kumar

06. "Hum Tum Aur Ye Nasha"  - Sapan Chakravarty, Chirashree Bhattacharya

Box office
The film was a super hit and eleventh highest-grossing movie of 1982.

Awards 
30th Filmfare Awards:

Nominated

 Best Comedian – Ashok Kumar
 Best Comedian – Utpal Dutt

Remakes

The film was remade in Telugu as Prema Pichollu with Chiranjeevi, Gummadi and Allu Ramalingaiah.

A remake of Shaukeen released under the title of The Shaukeens on 7 November 2014. The remake featured actors Piyush Mishra, Anupam Kher and Annu Kapoor  along with Lisa Haydon as the female lead. The film was  produced by Grazing Goat Pictures.

References

External links
 
Shaukeen on IBOS

1981 films
1980s Hindi-language films
Films directed by Basu Chatterjee
Films scored by R. D. Burman
1980s sex comedy films
Films about vacationing
Indian sex comedy films
Hindi films remade in other languages
1981 comedy films
1982 comedy films
1982 films
Films based on works by Samaresh Basu